St Tudwal's Church is a Roman Catholic parish church in Barmouth, Gwynedd. It is situated on the King Edward Road leading from Barmouth to Llanaber. It was built in 1905 and is in the Dolgellau Deanery of the Diocese of Wrexham.

History

Origin
Catholic worship started in Barmouth in 1890. A Fr. Donovan held services in the rooms of local houses until a small church was erected on Park Road. This was opened on 11 September 1891, on the very day that the steeple of the nearby St John's Church fell down. At the time, even though over forty years had elapsed since the re-establishment of the English and Welsh hierarchy, Wales had very few Catholics and the Catholic churches in the north of Wales came under the administration of the Diocese of Shrewsbury. In 1895, they came under the Vicariate Apostolic of Wales, then in 1898 it became the Diocese of Menevia. St Tudwal's was one of the few Catholic churches in the north of Wales at this time. It was created and persisted during this time of flux for Catholics in north Wales.

Construction
In the 1900s, a new priest arrived, Fr. C. B. Wilcock from St Helens, Merseyside. He worked to have a new, larger, church built to accommodate the increasing size of the local congregation. The church was completed in 1905 and was opened by the first Bishop of Menevia, Francis Mostyn. The inscription on the foundation-stone, translated from Latin reads:

In the year of Our Lord Incarnate the fifteenth of August 1904. On the Feast of the Assumption of the Holy Mother of God, the Virgin Mary, our Lord Francis, by the grace of God and the Apostolic See, Bishop of Menevia, laid this first stone in the honour of the same glorious Virgin Mary and Saint Tudwal.

Anniversary
On 1 September 1939, it was reported in the Catholic Herald that the church celebrated the 31st anniversary of its consecration. The priest at the time was Fr. Patrick Collins. He organised a Mass to be said in memory of the church's founder Fr Wilcock. A choir from De La Salle College in Fr Wilcock's home parish of the Church of St Mary, Lowe House in St Helens were on holiday in nearby Dyffryn Ardudwy and came to sing at the Mass.

Parish

The parish also contains St David in Seion Church in Harlech. St David's church was built in 1814 as a Seion Wesleyan Methodist chapel, and was given to the Roman Catholic Church by 1998.

St David's Church in Harlech has a Saturday Mass at 6:00pm and St Tudwal's church has a Sunday Mass at 11:00am. At St Tudwal's there are weekday Masses at 10:00am and a Saturday Mass at 9:00am.

Gallery

See also
 Diocese of Wrexham
 Barmouth

References

External links
 Barmouth Parish page

Grade II listed churches in Gwynedd
Roman Catholic churches completed in 1905
Saint Tudwal
Roman Catholic churches in Wales
Gothic Revival church buildings in Wales
1905 establishments in Wales
20th-century Roman Catholic church buildings in the United Kingdom